Costas Papaellinas Arena is an indoor arena in Strovolos, Nicosia, Cyprus. It is the home venue of the Keravnos BC. Currently the arena has a capacity around 2,000 seats.

References

Indoor arenas in Cyprus
Sport in Nicosia
Buildings and structures in Nicosia
Basketball venues in Cyprus